Clifton Hill is a settlement on the island of Saint Croix in the United States Virgin Islands.

References

External links

Historic American Engineering Record in the United States Virgin Islands
Populated places in Saint Croix, U.S. Virgin Islands